Sri Venkateswara College of Engineering (SVCE) is an  institute in Tamil Nadu, at Pennalur, Sriperumbudur near Chennai. SVCE was founded in 1985.  The college was established by the Southern Petrochemical Industries Corporation (SPIC) group. SVCE is among the top engineering colleges of Anna University in Tamil Nadu and a Tier-I institution among self-financing colleges.

History

In November 1985, the college was founded and granted permission by Vishnu Vardhan JP and to conduct engineering courses in  mechanical engineering, electronics and communication engineering, and computer science engineering, awarded by the University of Madras.

The college complex at Nazarathpet (near Poonamallee) was inaugurated on 8 April 1985 by the former Governor of Tamil Nadu.

In 1991, the college shifted into its new campus at Pennalur, near the town of Sriperumbudur. Sri Venkateswara College of Engineering received approval from the All India Council for Technical Education the same year. Courses in electrical & electronics engineering and chemical engineering were started in 1994.

SVCE celebrated its decennial in March 1995 in the presence of former Minister of State for Commerce and present home minister of the Government of India. In 1996 it began a course in information technology and was the first college in the country to do so. The college obtained an ISO 9001:2000 certification in 2002. SVCE obtained autonomy from UGC in 2016.

Rankings

The National Institutional Ranking Framework (NIRF) ranked it 176 among engineering colleges in 2020.

(ii) NAAC grade A+ got by SVCE.

Library
SVCE has a  library spanning three floors covering major fields of science and engineering, a conference room, a study space and a seating capacity of over 200. The library is air-conditioned and has conferencing, multimedia, internet, reprography facilities, a CD-ROM collection. and a book bank for deserving students.

The college subscribes to most major technical journals including those by the IEEE, ACM and ASME. Over 1,04,694 volumes and 1725 CDs are available and around 400 print and online journals are subscribed.

Apart from the central library, all departments maintain their own libraries. SVCE is an institutional member of The British Council Library, IIT Madras, American Council Library, DELNET and MALIBNET. The library uses multimedia computers with internet connectivity, computer-based training, CDs, e-books and e-journals to promote e-learning.

A new department of Information Management System (IMS) was started in 2012.

Sports infrastructure

The  facility has a swimming pool, synthetic and clay tennis courts, turf cricket ground, basketball, football grounds, badminton, volleyball courts, and a 400-meter track.

 is dedicated to a table tennis hall, gymnasium, and carom and chess rooms.

The college conducts inter-college tournaments in basketball, volleyball, cricket and ball badminton.

Research
Dr R Muthucumaraswamy, Professor and Head, Department of Applied Mathematics and Dean (Research) is taking care of the research activities in Sri Venkateswara College of Engineering(SVCE).

The following Eleven departments are recognised as research centres by Anna University to conduct PhD:
(i) Electrical and Electronics Engineering  
(ii) Mechanical Engineering
(iii) Chemical Engineering 
(iv) Mathematics
(v) Physics
(vi) Chemistry
(vii)Information Technology
(viii) Biotechnology
(ix) Computer Science and Engineering 
(x) Electronics and Communication Engineering.
(xi) Civil Engineering

The above mentioned departments have been Recognised research centres by Anna University as the collaborative research centers for PhD degrees.

R&D is aided by a technology innovation center (TIC), which houses SPIC's research centre. TIC houses an interdisciplinary centre for nanotechnology to carry out research. The centre supported by FIST. 

The management of SVCE sanctioned Rs.3,00,000 every year to carry out innovative projects for final year UG (2 Lakhs)and PG (one Lakh) students.

The SVCE students' research day (SVCE Innovates) is conducted in third week of March every year to motivate and nurture innovative ideas among Students.

Faculty research day is also conducted every year in the third week of April to share their research ideas among faculty and research scholars.

More than 74 faculty members are received recognised supervisors status from Anna University to guide research scholars. More than 139 faculty members with PhD qualification. More than 215 research scholars, including 27 full time research scholars, are pursuing PhD in SVCE research centers.  As on February 2023, 131 scholars (FT/PT (external)/PT (internal)) have completed their PhD through SVCE research centers. Eighteen faculty completed PhD from SVCE and 25 members of faculty of SVCE completed PhD from Anna University/other affiliated colleges of Anna University.

Ten faculty completed PhD from other University (IITM, Bharathiar University, MSU, JNTU)

Management of SVCE encourages the members of the faculty to do research and give incentives for their research output.
(i) Performance based research incentive for PhD qualified faculty.

(ii) Incentive for research publications in a reputed National/ International Journals.

(iii) The Management of SVCE is also giving additional incentive 2% of the amount received through funded projects. The same sanctioned after the successful completion of funded projects received from external agencies.

(iv) Special incentive for the consistent performer in research. This is based on the average score earned by the faculty for the three consecutive Academic years. Faculty scored above 50 are eligible to receive 25% from their basic pay. If the scored 40 and above then they are eligible to receive 15% of Incentive from their basic pay. If the score is 30 and above then they are eligible to receive 10% incentive and the calculations are similar to 25%.

Latest externally funded projects: 26

The Department of Electronics and Communication Engineering (Dr P Jothilakshmi, Professor-PI), received a research grant of Rs.4.1 Lakhs from Tamil Nadu State Council for Science and Technology (TNSCST) for the period of two years (2020-2022)

The Department of Applied Mathematics (Dr R MUTHUCUMARASWAMY, Dean(Research) Professor and Head-PI)received a research grant of Rs.17.79 Lakhs from National Board of Higher Mathematics (DAE-NBHM) under JRF scheme for the period of three years (2021-2024).

The Department of Biotechnology (Dr V Sumitha, Associate Professor and HOD incharge, SVCE and Dr Gugan Jayaraman, Professor, IITM), received a grant of Rs.18.30 Lakhs from DST-SERB under the scheme Teacher Associateship for Research Excellence (TARE) for the period of three years (2021-2024).

The Department of Information Technology (Dr C Yaasuwanth, Associate Professor-PI), received a research grant of Rs.17.27 Lakhs from ISRO under RESPOND JRF scheme for the period of three years (2021-2024).

The Department of Biotechnology (Dr P K Praveen Kumar, Associate Professor and Dr Michael Gromiha, Professor, IITM ) received a grant of Rs 18.30 lakhs from SERB-DST under the scheme Teacher Associateship for Research Excellence (TARE) for the period of three years (2021-2024).

The Department of Civil Engineering (Dr R Kumutha, Professor and Head), received a grant of Rs 18.30 lakhs from SERB-DST under the scheme Teacher Associateship for Research Excellence (TARE) for the period of three years (2022-2025).

The Department of Electrical and Electronics Engineering (Dr R Kannadasan, Assistant Professor(PI)), received a grant of Rs. 54 Lakhs from SERB under the Scheme EEQ for his project proposal titled "MULTI-LAYER-MULTI-PURPOSE SMART WASTE MANAGEMENT SYSTEM USING INTERNET OF THINGS (IoT)"
(2022-2024)

The Department of Applied Mathematics  (MUTHUCUMARASWAMY, Dean(Research) Professor and Head-PI and Dr A Suba, Assistant Professor)received a research grant of Rs.2.88 Lakhs from Defence Research Developmental Organization (DRDO) under ERIP/IPR scheme for the period of three years (2023-2025).

Six TNSCST projects are bagged by SVCE under final year Students Project Scheme for the academic year 2022–2023.

Three AIChE projects are bagged by SVCE under final year students project scheme for the Academic year 2022-2023

Patents Granted - 24
Patents published by IPR - 63

Seven patents are granted by Australian government, two patent Granted by Republic of South Africa and one patent granted by Germany.

Fourteen patents are granted by IPR to the following members of the faculty:

Year 2020 - (1)

Dr M Gajendran, Assistant Professor, Department of Mechanical Engineering.

Year 2021 - (2)

Dr N Meyappan, Professor and Head, Department of Chemical Engineering.

Dr C Gopinath, Associate Professor, Department of Electrical and Electronics Engineering.

Year 2022 -(7)

Dr Prem Anand, Associate Professor, Department of Mechanical Engineering.

Dr E Nakkeran, Professor, Department of Biotechnology.

Dr Kannadasan, Assistant Professor,  and Dr C Gopinath, Associate Professor, Department of Electrical and Electronics Engineering

Dr Jega Jothi and Dr C Yaasuwanth, Associate Professor, Department of Information Technology.

Dr P Geetha, Assistant Professor, Department of Computer science and Engineering.

Dr N Meiyappan, Professor and Head, Department of Chemical Engineering.

Dr C Gopinath, Associate Professor, Department of Electrical and Electronics Engineering.

Year 2023 (4)

Dr P Jothilakshmi, Professor, Department of Electronics and Communication Engineering, has granted a Design patent by IPR.

Dr A Bhaskaran, Professor and Head, Department of Applied Physics, has granted a Design patent by IPR.

Dr R Gayathri, Professor and Ms Mehzabeen, Assistant Professor, Department of Electronics and Communication Engineering, has granted a Design patent by IPR.

Mr Raj Vikram and passes out students of Electrical and Electronics Engineering, has granted a patent in the name of SVCE by IPR.

Intramural Research Grant (IRG)

SVCE funding in-house research projects to motivate and encourage young faculty into research. The Management announced and sanctioned Rs.3 Lakhs for three Departments each Rs.1 Lakh for the period of two years. Three grants (ECE/ CHE/MEC) are sanctioned by SVCE in the Academic year 2022-2023.

SVCE Research fellowship

This Fellowship for full time research scholars pursuing PhD in research Centres of SVCE. The Management of SVCE sanctioned 5 research fellowships for every year. For the first two years Rs.18000/- fellowship per month and third year the fellowship is Rs.20,000/-. As on date Four research scholars benefited in this scheme.

iGEM participation
Students from the department of biotechnology have formed teams and participated in the international Genetically Engineered Machines competition in 2015 and 2016, being the only Anna University affiliated college to do so. They were placed in the bronze medal category in 2015 and silver medal category in 2016. In 2015, they worked on finding alternatives to antibiotics and in 2016 worked on developing a system to prolong the shelf life of milk without refrigeration.

Entrepreneurship Development Cell
The Entrepreneurship Development Cell was formed in 1996 and has organized awareness camps to motivate students to become entrepreneurs. An Entrepreneurship Promotion and Incubation Center (EPIC) has been formed with support from Entrepreneurship Development Institute and MSME to incubate start-up companies with innovative ideas.

ally to be suitable to the requirements of the society. The campus is large with sprawling greenery and individual blocks for departments and research and development centres.

The cafeteria functions throughout the day and serves snacks, drinks and packed food items alongside South and North Indian breakfast and lunch choices. 
The Pennalurish Pupps and Birinji are of Top notch taste and the recipe is maintained for decades without any anomaly.

For an undergraduates at SVCE, there are many subject-based activities, lectures and workshops happening in between exams to keep the students engaged. The college has memorandum of understanding signed with industries and companies, including multinational giants, to enable research options and internship opportunities for professional development.

Housing
The SVCE housing comprises two clusters of seven blocks for men and three blocks for women. For the Marine Engineering students, it is mandatory to live in the hostels. A total of around 380 women and 850 men can stay in the hostel. Hostel area has indoor games, TV, WiFi and laundromats.

Forum For Economic Studies by Engineers

A club where students are taught how to manage finances and economics. Mock placements are conducted by them every year where they bring in real HRs to conduct mock interviews to pre-final years and help them learn on how to face real placements.

Curtain Call SVCE 
This is the dramatics club representing the college. It aims to improve the extracurricular participation among students by allowing them to join the club for various activities such as script writing, acting, direction and production. They have performed unique plays to a big audience through partnership with the company Crea Shakthi.

Speakers' Forum SVCE
A club where students are trained for their interpersonal skills, public speaking, Group discussion, debate and stand up. This forum is totally concentrated on enhancing students' communication skills and Peer mentoring.

References

Engineering colleges in Chennai
Academic institutions formerly affiliated with the University of Madras